Jixi North railway station (Chinese: 绩溪北站) is a railway station in Jixi County, Xuancheng, Anhui, China. It is on the incomplete Beijing–Taipei high-speed rail corridor.

History
The station was opened on 28 June 2015 with the Hefei–Fuzhou high-speed railway.

References

Railway stations in Anhui
Railway stations in China opened in 2015